The Comly Rich House is a historic house in the Frankford neighborhood of Philadelphia, Pennsylvania, notable as the first home in the United States financed by a savings and loan association, the Oxford Provident Building Society, founded 1831. To buy the house, which cost $500, Rich, variously described as a lamplighter or a maker of combs, received a loan of $375 in April 1831 from the Oxford Provident Building Association, founded the same year.

The two-and-a-half-story house, built around 1826, still stands at 4276 Orchard Street. It was listed on the Philadelphia Register of Historic Places in 1960.

External links
History at the U.S. Treasury's Office of Thrift Supervision
Listing and photographs at the Historic American Buildings Survey
Listing at Philadelphia Architects and Buildings

Houses completed in 1826
Houses in Philadelphia
Frankford, Philadelphia
1826 establishments in Pennsylvania